Microsternarchus is a genus of bluntnose knifefish that is found in creeks and streams, often in areas with submerged vegetation, roots and leaf litter, in the Amazon, Orinoco, Essequibo–Rupununi and Río de la Plata basins in South America. The other is M. brevis, which at up to only  is the world's smallest knifefish. Microsternarchus are very similar to Brachyhypopomus.

Species
There are currently 2 recognized species in this genus:

 Microsternarchus bilineatus Fernández-Yépez, 1968
 Microsternarchus brevis Cox Fernandes, A. Nogueira, A. D. Williston & Alves-Gomes, 2015

References

Hypopomidae
Taxa named by Augustín Fernández-Yépez
Fish of South America
Fish of Brazil
Freshwater fish genera